Beimen Station may refer to:

 Beimen railway station in Chiayi City, Taiwan
 Beimen metro station in Taipei City, Taiwan